The 2012 CONCACAF Women's Olympic Qualifying Tournament qualification determined five of the eight teams for the final tournament.

Tiebreakers
Per FIFA regulations the group tiebreakers for all qualifying tournaments will be:

goal difference in all group matches
greatest number of goals scored in all group matches
If two or more teams are equal on the basis of the above criteria, their rankings shall be determined as follows:
greater number of points obtained in all group matches between the teams concerned
goal difference resulting from the group matches between the teams concerned
greater number of goals scored in all group matches between the teams concerned
play-off match on neutral ground (with extra time and penalty kicks, if necessary)

Caribbean Zone
On 17 May 2011 CONCACAF announced the groups for the Caribbean qualifying. The group winners and the best runner-up will advance to the final qualifying tournament.

Group A
To be played from June 29–3 July 2011 in Aruba. All time in UTC−4.

Group B
To be played from 5–9 July 2011 in the Dominican Republic.

Ranking of second-placed teams

Central American Zone
UNCAF's two slots were contested in one group of five teams.  The top two advanced to the final qualifying tournament.  The matches were to be held in Guatemala from September 30 to October 8, 2011.

References

External links
2012 CONCACAF Women's Olympic Qualification

Qual